Radhika Madan (born 1 May 1995) is an Indian actress who works predominantly in Hindi films. After graduating from the Jesus and Mary College, she began her acting career with the television soap opera Meri Aashiqui Tum Se Hi (2014–2016). Madan made her film debut with Vishal Bhardwaj's comedy Pataakha in 2018, for which she won the Screen Award for Best Female Debut.

Madan has since starred in the films Mard Ko Dard Nahi Hota (2018), Angrezi Medium (2020) and Shiddat (2021), and the anthology series Ray (2021).

Early life and education
Radhika Madan was born on 1 May 1995 in Delhi, India. Her father, Sujit Madan is a businessman and her mother, Neeru Madan is a painter. She is one of two siblings. She has a brother, Arjun Madan.

Madan completed her schooling from Delhi Public School, Mathura Road, New Delhi, and did her graduation in Bachelor’s of Commerce from Jesus and Mary College, University of Delhi, New Delhi.

Career

Television career (2014–2017)
Hailing from Delhi, Madan started her career by making her acting debut in the daily soap opera TV series Meri Aashiqui Tum Se Hi on Colors TV. She played the female lead Ishaani Vaghela opposite Shakti Arora, that earned her massive popularity. The series became one of the most famous shows of Colors TV, airing for over 400 episodes from June 2014 to February 2016.

While busy in shooting for Meri Aashiqui Tum Se Hi, Madan also simultaneously participated in Colors TV's dance reality show Jhalak Dikhhla Jaa 8 in 2015.

Film career (2018–present)
Madan quit television to make her feature film debut in Vishal Bhardwaj's drama Pataakha (2018) alongside Sanya Malhotra. Based on the short story Do Behnen by Charan Singh Pathik, which revolved around two sisters in Rajasthan who are always on conflict. The story was based on the wives of Pathik's brothers, and for preparation, both Madan and Malhotra met the real women for the dialect and the character's nuances. For the preparation, both Malhotra and Madan stayed in Ronsi village near Jaipur and learned the Rajasthani dialect; they also got accustomed with milking buffaloes, thatching roofs, plastering the walls with dung and walking for long distances while balancing matkas full of water on their head and one around their waist. Raja Sen wrote in his review, "Radhika Madan positively shines in this bossy role, unwavering in dialect and determination."

In 2019, Madan was cast in Vasan Bala's action comedy Mard Ko Dard Nahi Hota with newcomer Abhimanyu Dassani. It premiered in the Midnight Madness section of the 2018 Toronto International Film Festival, where it won the People's Choice Award: Midnight Madness. The film was also screened at the 2018 MAMI Film Festival. Madan mentioned that she was auditioning for Laila Majnu (2018) when got to know about Mard Ko Dard Nahi Hota and chose the latter film because of its "uniqueness". She performed all the stunts herself and watched several classic action films for days to famliarise herself with the genre. She was also injured while the physical training. Pradeep Menon of Firstpost called her a "delight as Supri" and noted that Madan "manages to make it work by sheer will and talent" despite the character having an "inconsistent treatment". He further said that she "sparkles in the action sequences."

In 2020, Madan appeared in Homi Adajania's comedy-drama Angrezi Medium with Irrfan Khan and Kareena Kapoor, which was Khan's last film before his death in April 2020. Anupama Chopra called her an "absolute natural" in the role. Writing that she "captures the unforced innocence of a 17-year-old, desperate to get out of her small town and see the world."

In 2021, Madan did a variety of four projects. She made her entry into web series with her performances as Divya Didi in Ray and Avani Rajvansh in Feels Like Ishq, both of which earned critical praise. She also worked in the music video Ni Jaana, a single by Jasleen Royal. Her only film in 2021 was released on Disney+ Hotstar. It was Kunal Deshmukh's romance film Shiddat with Sunny Kaushal.

In 2022, she was seen in an guest appearance in Netflix neo-noir crime comedy thriller film Monica, O My Darling. In 2023, her first release came with Vishal Bhardwaj's production and his son Aasmaan's directorial debut crime thriller film Kuttey which was released threatically with mixed to positive reviews from critics. Sukanya Verma of Rediff wrote, "Radhika's candour stays true to Kuttey's unhinged ways".

Upcoming projects
Madan has next four projects lined up will next appear in Kacchey Limbu with Rajat Barmecha and Ayush Mehra. She has completed shoot for Adajania's untitled web series. She plays the titular character in Sudhanshu Saria's Sanaa. The film will have its world premiere at the 26th Tallinn Black Nights Film Festival in November 2022. She completed shooting for Tamil film Soorarai Pottru remake alongside Akshay Kumar and Paresh Rawal. Madan also started filming for Dinesh Vijan's social thriller film Happy Teacher's Day with Nimrat Kaur in September 2022.

Filmography

Films

Web series

Television

Music videos

Accolades

See also
List of Indian film actresses

References

External links

 
 

1995 births
Living people
Punjabi Hindus
Indian television actresses
Indian film actresses
Actresses from Delhi
Actresses in Hindi cinema
Actresses in Hindi television
21st-century Indian actresses
Delhi University alumni
Screen Awards winners